The 1875 City of Auckland West by-elections were two by-elections held in the  electorate in Auckland, following two resignations during the 4th New Zealand Parliament

Thomas Gillies resigned when he was appointed a judge of the Supreme Court and was replaced  unopposed on 27 March by George Grey.
John Williamson died on 16 February and was replaced on 14 April by Patrick Dignan. He was opposed by Joseph Dargaville, a member of the Orange Order, Dignan was a Catholic.

Results

References

Auckland West, 1875
1875 elections in New Zealand
Politics of the Auckland Region
April 1875 events
March 1875 events
1870s in Auckland